Cobalt Health is an independent medical charity established in 1964  to help people affected by cancer, dementia and other conditions. They provide diagnostic imaging for over 115,000 patients annually at imaging centres in Cheltenham and Birmingham, England, and through a fleet of mobile MRI, CT Scan and PET-CT scanners for NHS hospitals and other medical facilities across the UK. 

The Charity is regulated by the Care Quality Commission and meets the standards set by the Quality Standard for Imaging (QSI). It is also accredited with ISO 9001:2015 quality and ISO 14001 environmental management standard.

External links
Official website
Care Quality Commission Cobalt page
Quality Standard for Imaging information
Health charities in the United Kingdom
Organizations established in 1964